The City of Moncton and its metropolitan area (Dieppe and Riverview) is the largest in New Brunswick, Canada. Its skyline is dominated by the Bell Aliant Tower, constructed in 1971 at a height of 127 m (417 ft - Equiv. to approx. 32 floors), the tallest free-standing structure in all four Atlantic provinces. 
The tallest building in the city is the 20-storey,  Assumption Place. The complex, with its two adjoining mid rise structure, was completed in 1972.
The city has more mid rise structures spread out in the urbanized region, i.e. 20 m to 35 m, than the high rises.

Tallest buildings
This includes spires and architectural details but does not include antenna masts. Freestanding observation and/or telecommunication towers, while not habitable buildings, are included for comparison purposes; however, they are not ranked. One such tower is the Bell Aliant Tower.

Tallest under construction
The Five Five Queen Street is a 9-storey (33.6 metres) boutique Hotel, the Wesley, with a restaurant on the lower level and luxurious condos on the upper levels. It is slated to be completed in the fall of 2018.

Under construction in the city of Dieppe is a 30 metres 10-storey apartment complex, Place Horizon Place, on Sunset Street overlooking Paul Street.

Other buildings and structures
 
Andal Place
Constructed in 1973 and located at 860 Main Street, the low-rise 8-storey modernism style concrete building has an architectural height of 32 metres - roof 28 metres. TD Bank has been the main tenant since the early 1990s.

See also

 List of buildings in Moncton
 List of tallest buildings in Atlantic Canada

References

External links
 Moncton on SkyscraperPage
 Moncton on Emporis Buildings

 
Moncton
Tallest buildings in Moncton